Nepenthes ceciliae is a tropical pitcher plant endemic to the Philippine island of Mindanao, where it grows at 1500–1880 m above sea level. Its discovery was announced online in August 2011.

Nepenthes ceciliae belongs to the informal "N. alata group", which also includes N. alata, N. copelandii, N. extincta, N. graciliflora, N. hamiguitanensis, N. kitanglad, N. kurata, N. leyte, N. mindanaoensis, N. negros, N. ramos, N. saranganiensis, and N. ultra. These species are united by a number of morphological characters, including winged petioles, lids with basal ridges on the lower surface (often elaborated into appendages), and upper pitchers that are usually broadest near the base. In their original paper defining the N. alata group, Martin Cheek and Matthew Jebb treated N. ceciliae as possibly conspecific with N. copelandii.

Natural hybrids
 N. ceciliae × N. pulchra

References

 Gronemeyer, T. 2012. Nepenthes ceciliae. In: AIPC Special Issue 4: News of 2011. Associazione Italiana Piante Carnivore. p. 19.

Carnivorous plants of Asia
ceciliae
Endemic flora of the Philippines
Flora of Mindanao
Plants described in 2011